Hong Kong Federation of Education Workers (HKFEW) is a pro-Beijing teachers union in Hong Kong. Established in 1975, it is currently the largest teachers union in Hong Kong, after the disbandment of the Hong Kong Professional Teachers' Union. It was established to "rally teachers to adopt the position of 'loving Hong Kong and the Motherland'", as part of China's united front work in Hong Kong's educational sector.

The trade union has some 42,000 members, as of 2021. Former presidents, Jasper Tsang and Cheng Kai-nam, were also leaders of The Democratic Alliance for the Betterment and Progress of Hong Kong (DAB), a pro-Beijing political party. Tsang and Cheng had built up relationships with pro-Beijing teachers and mobilized them to vote for DAB in legislative and district elections. The HKFEW is said to play a crucial role in mobilizing pro-Beijing teachers to vote for like-minded candidates in the education functional constituency in the legislative council election.

The HKFEW, through its  which received an annual funding of HK$13 million from the government, produced a 34-page booklet titled ‘’ for schools which extolled the virtues of the mainland government under its one-party communist rule.

Views 
In July 2022, Tang Fei, member of the HKFEW and also a Legislative Council member, argued that boys in school should have short hair, saying that boys "sweat more" and therefore should have short hair.

Election performance

Legislative Council elections

See also 

 HKFEW Wong Cho Bau Secondary School
 Hong Kong Professional Teachers' Union
 Education in Hong Kong

External links 
Hong Kong Federation of Education Workers (in Chinese)

References 

Trade unions in Hong Kong
1975 establishments in Hong Kong
Trade unions established in 1975